Kenneth Ronald "Ken" French (born March 10, 1954) is the Roth Family Distinguished Professor of Finance at the Tuck School of Business, Dartmouth College.  He has previously been a faculty member at MIT, the Yale School of Management, and the University of Chicago Booth School of Business. He is most famous for his work on asset pricing with Eugene Fama. They wrote a series of papers that cast doubt on the validity of the Capital Asset Pricing Model (CAPM), which posits that a stock's beta alone should explain its average return. These papers describe two factors above and beyond a stock's market beta which can explain differences in stock returns: market capitalization and "value". They also offer evidence that a variety of patterns in average returns, often labeled as "anomalies" in past work, can be explained with their Fama–French three-factor model.

Education 
He obtained a B.S. in 1975, from Lehigh University in mechanical engineering.  He then earned an M.B.A. in 1978, an M.S. in 1981, and a Ph.D. in finance in 1983, all from the University of Rochester.  In 2005, French became a Rochester Distinguished Scholar.

Career 
Along with contributing articles to major journals such as the Journal of Finance, the Journal of Financial Economics, the Review of Financial Studies, the American Economic Review, the Journal of Political Economy, and the Journal of Business, French is also a research associate at the National Bureau of Economic Research, an advisory editor at the Journal of Financial Economics, and a former associate editor of the Journal of Finance and the Review of Financial Studies.

Professor French was the vice president of the American Finance Association in 2005 and was the organization's president in 2007-8. Also in 2007, Professor French was elected to the American Academy of Arts and Sciences (AAAS).

French is a board member of Dimensional Fund Advisors in Austin, Texas, where he also works as Consultant and Head of Investment Policy.

References

External links
 Home page at Dartmouth College
 Biography at Dimensional Fund Advisors
 Highly Cited Researchers
 2005 Thompson Scientific Shortlisting

1954 births
Living people
Financial economists
21st-century American economists
Lehigh University alumni
MIT Sloan School of Management faculty
Tuck School of Business faculty
University of Chicago faculty
University of Rochester alumni
Yale School of Management faculty
Fellows of the American Academy of Arts and Sciences
Presidents of the American Finance Association